The Suicide Squad is an antihero/supervillain team appearing in American comic books published by DC Comics. The first version of the Suicide Squad debuted in The Brave and the Bold #25 (September 1959) and the second and modern version, created by John Ostrander, debuted in Legends #3 (January 1987).

Various incarnations of the Suicide Squad have existed throughout the years as depicted in several self-titled comic book series, from its origins in the Silver Age to its modern-day Post-Crisis re-imagining, to the current version that was introduced in 2016. The current incarnation of the team appears in the sixth volume of the Suicide Squad comic series, and the recurring members include Enchantress, Katana, Killer Croc, Captain Boomerang, Deadshot and Harley Quinn.

Background and creation
The original Suicide Squad appeared in six issues of The Brave and the Bold. Although this early incarnation of the team (created by writer Robert Kanigher and artist Ross Andru) did not have the espionage trappings of later Squads, it laid much of the groundwork for squad field leader Rick Flag Jr.'s personal history. The team's administrator Amanda Waller was introduced in the Legends miniseries, with the original Silver Age Squad's backstory fleshed out further in Secret Origins (vol. 2) #14.

The Suicide Squad was revived in the Legends miniseries with writer John Ostrander at the helm. The renewed concept involved the government employing a group of supervillains to perform missions that were suicide runs, a concept popular enough for an ongoing series titled simply Suicide Squad. The squad was often paired together with DC's other government agency, Checkmate, culminating in the Janus Directive crossover.

While the Squad is often depicted as succeeding on their missions, they did fail some as well. Ostrander remarked on how Squad stories sometimes purposefully brought in characters to be killed off. The team's very name, Suicide Squad, relates to the idea that this group of characters is sent on dangerous and difficult suicide missions.

Suicide Squad (vol. 1) lasted 66 issues, along with one Annual and one special (Doom Patrol and Suicide Squad Special #1). After the series' cancellation in 1992, the Squad went on to make several guest appearances in titles such as Superboy, Hawk & Dove, Chase, and The Adventures of Superman.

Suicide Squad (vol. 2) was published in 2001, written by Keith Giffen, with art by Paco Medina. Though the series' first issue featured a Squad composed entirely of Giffen's Injustice League members, the roster was promptly slaughtered, save for Major Disaster and Multi-Man. These developments prompt Sgt. Rock, who is by now written into the role of squad leader, to recruit new members—many of whom die during the missions.

Suicide Squad (vol. 3) (initially subtitled Raise the Flag in DC's solicitations) was an eight-issue miniseries published in 2007. It featured the return of writer John Ostrander with art by Javier Pina. The story focused on the return of Rick Flag Jr. and the formation of a new Squad to attack a corporation responsible for developing a deadly bio-weapon.

Suicide Squad (vol. 4) debuted as part of DC Comics' line-wide New 52 continuity reboot in 2011. The relaunched book was written by Adam Glass, with art by Federico Dallocchio and Ransom Getty. Amanda Waller once again directs the group from behind the scenes; Deadshot, Harley Quinn, and King Shark feature prominently in this version of the Squad. This series concluded in 2014, with issue #30.

New Suicide Squad was launched in July 2014. Written by Sean Ryan with art by Jeremy Roberts, the new series continues to feature Deadshot and Harley Quinn, with Deathstroke, Black Manta, and Joker's Daughter added to the mix.

Publication history

Silver Age

Plot synopsis

The Brave and the Bold

The original Suicide Squad first appears in The Brave and the Bold #25. Team members appearing in the debut issue include physicist Jess Bright; astronomer Dr. Hugh Evans; Rick Flag Jr., the team leader; and Karin Grace (Davies in #25), flight medic. The characters have follow-up appearances in issues #26, #27 and #37-#39. The team's introductory story depicts them being called in to deal with a super-heated red-hued object, called the "Red Wave", which was heading toward a seaside resort and boiling the ocean along the way. They travel in a plane equipped with a testing and analysis lab. Follow-up appearances show the team dealing with a variety of challenges: a meteor storm (the radiation from which causes them to shrink), a giant serpent in the Paris subway tunnels, a giant monster that captures Karin, and a nuclear bomb. Issues #38 and #39 show the team encountering dinosaurs and meeting the leader of the Cyclops.

Legends

In the midst of Darkseid's attempt to turn humanity against Earth's superheroes via his minion Glorious Godfrey, Amanda Waller assigns Rick Flag Jr. leadership of a reformed Task Force X. Blockbuster, Bronze Tiger, Captain Boomerang, Deadshot, and Enchantress make up Task Force X at Belle Reve. The squad's first mission is to eliminate Darkseid's rampaging fire elemental Brimstone; Blockbuster dies during the conflict and Deadshot takes down the creature with an experimental laser rifle. Waller dismisses the group, though they soon reconvened to rescue Captain Boomerang after Godfrey captures him.

Secret Origins (vol. 2)

During World War II, a number of Army riffraff are assembled into a unit that is highly expendable, and therefore nicknamed the Suicide Squadron (shortened to Suicide Squad). Several such teams existed, but their history in comics is only scarcely recorded before Rick Flag, Sr. becomes the leader of the team (and even then, only a few adventures of this Squad are shown). After the war ends, the team (together with the Argent group) is put under the umbrella organization of Task Force X. After his father's death, Rick Flag Jr. goes on to lead the group that is featured in The Brave and the Bold. A deadly encounter with a Yeti during a mission in Cambodia ends with Evans and Bright dead and sends Flag back to the U.S. with a wounded Karin Grace. After a stint with the Forgotten Heroes, Flag is drafted into the Squad that Waller assembles in Legends.

"A Princess' Story" from Secret Origins (vol. 2) #28 sheds light on Nightshade's origin, revealing that her mother hailed from the Land of the Nightshades. An ill-fated trip to this world ends with Nightshade's mother died and her brother abducted, and Nightshade spends the following years honing her shadowy powers and building a reputation as a crimefighter. She falls in with King Faraday at the C.B.I.; Faraday eventually introduces her to Amanda Waller, who agrees to help her rescue her brother in exchange for Nightshade's participation in the Squad.

Other World War II Suicide Squads
The World War II Squad of Secret Origins (vol. 2) #14 was a means of tying the Silver Age Suicide Squad to the war-era Suicide Squad (also called the Suicide Squadron) created by Robert Kanigher for his "The War that Time Forgot" tales in the pages of Star Spangled War Stories. This Suicide Squadron is described as a "top-secret Ranger outfit" whose members were trained to tackle missions from which ordinary volunteers were not expected to return alive. It is unclear whether this team is part of the modern Suicide Squad canon or if the Squad introduced in Secret Origins was intended as a replacement for them in DC continuity.

Another classic version of the Squad (Rick Flag Jr., Karin Grace, Jess Bright, and Dr. Hugh Evans) appears in the non-canon 2004 miniseries DC: The New Frontier by Darwyn Cooke. The group is briefly shown undertaking the sorts of dangerous missions the Squad is known for, and Flag eventually drafts Hal Jordan onto the team to assist in preparing a crewed space flight to Mars. The experimental rocket's test runs quickly goes south and the group (sans Jordan) dies in the explosion.

In the DC Comics Bombshells continuity, the World War II-era Suicide Squad is led by Francine Charles and consists of Killer Croc, Enchantress, Rose Wilson, and Barbara Gordon (who in this setting is a vampire). In the final issue of the comic, it is revealed that after the end of the war, this Suicide Squad became a "Dark Justice League" defending the world against magical threats.

Suicide Squad (vol. 1)

Background
The first volume of Suicide Squad, written by modern Squad creator John Ostrander, launched in May 1987, shortly after the team was introduced in the "Legends" crossover storyline. It lasted for 66 monthly issues, along with one annual and one special (Doom Patrol and Suicide Squad Special #1), both published in 1988.

This series details the covert operations of the modern Post-Crisis Squad, created (in-universe) and directed by Amanda Waller. It is notable for bringing obscure characters such as Captain Boomerang and Deadshot to prominence; the latter received his own tie-in miniseries in 1988, co-written by Ostrander and Kim Yale. The Suicide Squad also presents a modern context for field team leader Rick Flag Jr.'s modern-day activities and his involvement in the Silver-Age Suicide Squad. Former Batgirl Barbara Gordon makes her first appearance as the information-broker Oracle, and serves as the Squad's remote radio support, a vocation she adopted after being shot by the Joker. She uses a wheelchair as a result of being shot.

Suicide Squad (vol. 1) takes pains to humanize its relatively obscure ensemble cast, partly via an in-house chaplain and psychiatric staff at the Squad's Belle Reve headquarters. These staff members are frequently seen interviewing various Squad operatives or providing evaluations of their mental states; several full issues are dedicated to examining prominent characters' personal lives and motivations.

Plot synopsis
Throughout 66 issues, this incarnation of the Suicide Squad undertook numerous high-risk missions for the U.S. government.

"Baptism of Fire"
The team's first mission in the Suicide Squad title set them up against their recurring enemies, the Onslaught. They infiltrate their headquarters (the fortress known as Jotunheim, situated in Qurac) and proceed to defeat and kill most of the Onslaught members. Elements from this first story arc return over the series, such as the death of Mindboggler, Captain Boomerang's cowardly and treacherous nature, Nightshade's attraction to Rick Flag Jr., a rivalry between Rustam and Flag, and Ravan's defeat at the hands of the Bronze Tiger.

"Mission to Moscow"
On orders of Derek Tolliver (the team's liaison with the UNSC), the Suicide Squad is sent to Moscow in order to free the captive Zoya Trigorin, a revolutionary writer. Although the mission is largely successful in its first half, the team finds that Zoya does not want to be freed at all, causing friction among the team as they must plan their escape.

In the end, the mission ends with the Squad having to travel across a tundra to reach safety, but come face to face with the People's Heroes, the Russian's own group of metahumans. In the conflict, Trigorin dies, and Nemesis (Tom Tresser) is captured. It turns out Tolliver never even considered the possibility of Trigorin wishing to become a martyr, automatically leaping at the conclusion she would be eager to leave the Soviet Union, and thus risked Waller's wrath upon the mission's end.

Nemesis eventually escapes thanks to a collaboration between the Suicide Squad and the Justice League International, although the two teams fight one another first. This conflict is primarily the result of Batman's investigation into the Suicide Squad, his confrontation with Waller, and his being forced to drop the investigation when she reveals that she can easily figure out his secret identity if need be.

"Rogues" and "Final Round"
In this story arc, building on subplots from previous issues, Rick Flag goes after Senator Cray in order to assassinate him. Previously, Senator Cray had been blackmailing Amanda Waller in order for her to ensure Cray's reelection, threatening her with the exposure of the Suicide Squad to the public.

At first, there is also the threat of Waller being usurped by Derek Tolliver, the now-former liaison between the Squad and NSC, who conspires with Cray against Waller. Waller deals with the situation by engaging in counter-blackmail with help of Checkmate, but refrains from informing Flag. The Squad's existence is in danger, and he decides to deal with the problem himself.

Manhunter quits the Squad upon learning of their upcoming mission against Loa in New Orleans, LA.

In order to stop him, the Squad is sent after Flag, and it is eventually Deadshot who confronts Flag shortly before he can shoot Cray, but too late to prevent Tolliver's murder in Suicide Squad #21. As a result of these developments, the Suicide Squad is exposed to the public, contrary to Flag's intentions. Flag flees the scene, while Deadshot is shot by the arriving police officers. Unfortunately for Deadshot, who has a death wish, he does not die from the injuries.

Resulting from the exposure, Amanda Waller is replaced by an actor named Jack Kale so that she can continue to run the Squad. The team then goes on a public relations offensive, becoming, for a time, a prominent heroic team by saving a renowned nun from a repressive regime. Rick Flag travels to Jotunheim, where the Onslaught is still headquartered, and finishes the mission his father could not, blowing up Jotunheim with a prototype nuclear Nazi weapon but gives up his life to do so.

"The Janus Directive"

"The Janus Directive" is a crossover storyline involving an interagency war between Checkmate, the Suicide Squad, and Project Atom, who are manipulated by Kobra in order to distract the United States intelligence community from his activities. During the crossover, the headquarters of Checkmate and the Suicide Squad are destroyed as the war between the agencies worsens, and the lives of all members of the Force of July are lost except for Major Victory. In the end, with the defeat of Kobra, the various government agencies are made autonomous, to be overseen by Sarge Steel.

"Apokolips Now"
In this issue, the character known as Duchess regains her memory after suffering from amnesia and recalls her true identity as Lashina, of the Female Furies. With help from Shade the Changing Man, Lashina kidnaps several members of the Squad and takes them to Apokolips to win back her place among the Furies. Along with Dr. Light, Squad support members Briscoe (helicopter pilot) and computer specialist/Waller aide Flo Crowley are killed in an attack by para demons. Prevented by Steel from going, Bronze Tiger recruits Deadshot and others and joins with the Forever People to journey to Apokolips. Darkseid arrives to destroy Lashina for bringing humans to his world and allows the rest of the Squad return to Earth with their dead. Shade is returned to his home dimension as the Squad mourns Flo.

"The Coils of the LOA"
This issue details the plan of a group called LOA to raise a zombie army with drugs spread across the world. To ensure the Squad doesn't interfere, they reveal how Waller is still in charge and the White House decide to wash their hands of her. With the Suicide Squad on the verge of being disbanded by her superiors, Waller gathers Ravan, Poison Ivy, and Deadshot in an assassination mission of the LOA. The deal for the villains is simple: the three will be set free after helping Waller kill the LOA. While the villains run after the assassination, Waller allows herself to be put into custody.

"The Phoenix Gambit"
The storyline running through Suicide Squad (vol. 1) #40–43 reassembles a scattered Suicide Squad after a year of imprisonment for Amanda Waller. She receives a presidential pardon, courtesy of Sarge Steel, as well as money in the bank and her old privileges concerning the use of imprisoned villains.

This is done so that Waller can reassemble her Squad and prevent a confrontation between American and Soviet forces in the war-torn country of Vlatava. As the Suicide Squad succeeds and finishes their mission, they go in a new direction, free from the government as freelance operatives per the terms negotiated by Waller. Under the leadership of Waller, who now also goes into the field as an operative, they are a mercenary squad open to the highest bidder.

"Serpent of Chaos"
This storyline ran through Suicide Squad #45–47. Amanda Waller and the Squad covertly sneak into Jerusalem seeking to capture or kill Kobra. However, the squad's arrival is detected by the Hayoth, and their Mossad liaison Colonel Hacohen takes Waller and Vixen into custody in order to show them that the Hayoth has already captured Kobra. Amanda figures out that Kobra allowed the Hayoth to capture him but is unsure of why. Judith follows Vixen to a meeting with the Bronze Tiger and Ravan, critically wounds Vixen, and is nearly killed by the Bronze Tiger. Meanwhile, the Atom discovers Kobra's true plan all along was to corrupt Dybbuk the Hayoth's artificial intelligence team member. Kobra "corrupted" Dybbuk through a series of philosophical conversations about the nature of good and evil; he then attempts to use Dybbuk to start World War III. The day is saved by Ramban, the team's kabbalistic magician, who has a lengthy conversation with Dybbuk about the true nature of good and evil, choice, and morality. Meanwhile, Ravan and Kobra have their final battle which results in Ravan's supposed death via poisoning.

"Mystery of the Atom"
Batman is working to solve the murder of Ray Palmer, The Atom. He hears that Waller possibly knew about the explosion that killed him. Superman is told by a CBI agent that the Suicide Squad would be attempting to rescue Qurac's former President Marlo. Adam Cray confronts Deadshot about killing his father, Senator Cray. Golem, of the Hayoth enters the facility holding Marlo on Blood Island. The Hayoth mistakenly believe they would be allowed to take President Marlo into custody. This misunderstanding caused the Hayoth to become embroiled in a four-way conflict with the Justice League (Superman, Batman, and Aquaman), who were there searching for Ray Palmer (the Atom), as well as the Suicide Squad, and the Onslaught. After a series of skirmishes, Superman ends the free-for-all with a shockwave caused by clapping both his hands together. The League confronts Ray Palmer, and he tells them about Micro Force and their murder of Adam Cray, the man who had been impersonating him as a member of the Suicide Squad.

"Rumble in the Jungle"
The series concludes in issues #63–66, in which the Suicide Squad travels to Diabloverde to depose a seemingly invulnerable and invincible dictator calling himself Guedhe. This despot has his own personal bodyguards, a group of villains calling themselves the Suicide Squad. Insulted by the rival team usurping the Suicide Squad name, Waller accepts the mission to liberate Diabloverde at the price of one peso, paid by an exiled resident, Maria.

During that mission, they face off against and defeat the other Suicide Squad. Each Squad member travels through the mystic jungle to Guedhe's fortress and along the way, faces their personal demons, except for Deadshot. Amanda Waller tricks the despot, actually Maria's husband, into a form of suicide. The despot believes himself to be immortal, when in actuality, he was a formidable psychic whose consciousness kept animating his remains. Waller convinced him that her touch brought death and thus, he died. Afterward, Waller disbands the Suicide Squad, and the series ends.

Membership: Amanda Waller's Squad

Notable team members from Suicide Squad (vol. 1) include:

 Amanda Waller
 Rick Flag Jr.
 Bronze Tiger
 Captain Boomerang (George "Digger" Harkness)
 Count Vertigo
 Deadshot
 Joker
 Doctor Light (Arthur Light)
 Duchess (Lashina)
 Enchantress
 Jewelee
 Nemesis (Tom Tresser)
 Nightshade
 Oracle (Barbara Gordon)
 Poison Ivy
 Punch
 Ravan
 Shade, the Changing Man
 Thinker II (Cliff Carmichael)
 Vixen

Interim stories (between Vol. 1–2)

Background
Though John Ostrander's Suicide Squad (vol. 1) series was canceled in 1992 with issue #66, the concept lived on in various DC storylines throughout the years. What follows is a breakdown of the Squad's various odd appearances over the years.

Plot synopsis

Superboy (vol. 3): "Watery Grave"

The Squad resurfaces in a three-issue Superboy (vol. 3) arc, with a lineup consisting of Captain Boomerang, Deadshot, King Shark, Knockout, Sam Makoa, and Sidearm (who meets his death in the following issue). Superboy himself joins the Squad to assist in taking out a Pacific Rim crime cartel called the Silicon Dragons. Writer Karl Kesel claims to have come very close to killing Captain Boomerang during this arc.

Hawk & Dove (vol. 4)

In the Hawk & Dove (vol. 4) miniseries, superheroes Hawk and Dove (Sasha Martens and Wiley Wolverman) are targeted by the government who assemble a new Suicide Squad to subdue the pair. Squad members at the time include Bronze Tiger, Count Vertigo, Deadshot, Flex, Quartzite, Shrapnel, and Thermal.

Chase (vol. 1): "Letdowns"

Amanda Waller reforms the Squad once again in Chase #2. D.E.O. agent Cameron Chase joins Bolt, Copperhead, Killer Frost, and Sledge on a mission to take out a South American military base, only to be betrayed by the villains.

Superman: Our Worlds at War Secret Files & Origins: "Resources"

The brief story "Resources" (one of several in the issue) depicts Amanda Waller assembling the Squad that is seen in the Adventures of Superman arc.

Adventures of Superman (vol. 1): "The Doomsday Protocol"

Lex Luthor organizes another Suicide Squad during his term as President of the United States so that they can recruit Doomsday to battle the alien Imperiex. This version of the Squad consists of Chemo, Mongul, Plasmus, and Shrapnel; it is led by Manchester Black, under the supervision of Steel. Doomsday seemingly kills most of the Squad upon his release, but all of the characters turn up alive in later comics.

Suicide Squad (vol. 2)

Background
Keith Giffen's short-lived Suicide Squad run (which began in November 2001 and lasted 12 issues) is something of a darkly humorous analog to the writer's former work on Justice League International, and follows a new version of the Squad, designated Task Force Omega, and run by Sgt. Frank Rock. Together with his right-hand man Bulldozer, Rock taps new characters Havana and Modern to round out the team's mobile HQ. President Lex Luthor and Secretary of Metahuman Affairs Amanda Waller are shown to be supplying the Squad's assignments.

Rock is thought by several other characters to have been deceased since the end of World War II, and they are surprised to see him alive and well. Two flashback stories provide some context for Rock's current-day activities, but the series' final issue strongly implies that Rock is an (as-yet-unidentified) impostor.

Plot synopsis
The First issue details the former Injustice League's terminally botched attempt to extract a kidnapped scientist from an Icelandic facility. With all but one team member (Major Disaster) presumed dead by issue's end, Sgt. Rock forms a new Suicide Squad for the missions ahead. Major Disaster, Deadshot, and Killer Frost are mainstays of the field team. For his part, Rock is every bit as ruthless as Amanda Waller was (though far more affable), remorselessly sending his agents to die for the good of their country.

The Squad's missions involve eliminating an out-of-control colony of bio-engineered army ants, and investigating the mysterious island of Kooey Kooey Kooey to discourage its telepathic inhabitants from declaring war on Earth. Havana is revealed to be Amanda Waller's daughter, and the final story arc revolves around an all-out attack on the Squad by the members of Onslaught, led by the son of longtime Squad enemy Rustam. Onslaught kills Modem and captures Rock, Havana, and Waller.

Upon learning that the Squad has been compromised, Waller's office drafts the Justice Society of America to counterattack Onslaught alongside the Squad, but they arrive too late to save Havana from Rustam's wrath. Deadshot discovers a discarded Sgt. Rock mask inside an empty holding cell, which prompts Bulldozer (who is monitoring the situation remotely via Deadshot's video camera) to stand from his wheelchair and announce "Oh, boy!" before leaving. Back in her office, Amanda Waller reviews Bulldozer's file, and states that he and Sgt. Rock died in 1945.

Membership: Task Force Omega

Notable team members from Suicide Squad (vol. 2) include:

 Amanda Waller
 Sgt. Frank Rock (implied to be an impostor)
 Big Sir
 Bulldozer
 Clock King (William Tockman)
 Cluemaster
 Deadshot
 Havana
 Killer Frost (Louise Lincoln)
 Major Disaster
 Modem
 Multi-Man

Interim stories (between Vol. 2–3)

Background
Amanda Waller and the Suicide Squad were heavily involved in the events and fallout of 52. During much of this time, Waller ran the Squad covertly because of her station as the White Queen of Checkmate. This inter-faction tension is a recurring theme throughout many Squad stories of this era.

Plot synopsis

Superman (vol. 2): "Dead Men"

A Squad composed of Deadshot, Killer Frost, and Solomon Grundy goes after Lois Lane in order to silence her investigation into Lex Luthor's presidency.

Superman Secret Files & Origins 2004: "Suicide Watch"

A mystery agent sends Captain Boomerang, Double Down, Killer Frost, and Killer Shark to (unsuccessfully) assassinate an imprisoned Amanda Waller as she awaits trial. Nemesis also appears.

52

Amanda Waller assembles a short-lived Suicide Squad, led by Atom Smasher, to take on an out-of-control Black Adam. Atom Smasher's team ambushes the Black Marvel Family, getting Waller the evidence that she needs to expose their threat to the world. As Waller reviews future potential Squad members, Atom Smasher quits the team, threatening to inform Checkmate of Waller's unauthorized field ops unless she grants him a full pardon. Later, as World War III rages, Waller informs Bronze Tiger that Rick Flag Jr. is alive.

Checkmate (vol. 2): "Rogue Squad"

As part of DC's One Year Later event, Greg Rucka penned the two-part "Rogue Squad" arc for Checkmate (vol. 2). After Bronze Tiger finds Rick Flag Jr. alive, Amanda Waller (now the White Queen of Checkmate) taps the pair to track down a rogue Squad that is out to expose her off-the-books activities. The Squad is led by Mirror Master, and includes Icicle, Javelin, Plastique, Tattooed Man, Punch, and Jewelee.

Salvation Run

Beginning in the pages of Countdown, the Squad makes various one-off appearances where they are seen rounding up the world's villains for an unknown purpose. This culminates in the seven-issue Salvation Run miniseries (written by Bill Willingham), where the Squad sends the apprehended villains to a remote prison world via boom tube. Squad members seen rounding up villains include Rick Flag Jr., Bronze Tiger, Captain Boomerang, Count Vertigo, the General, King Faraday, Multiplex, Nightshade, Plastique, Bane, Chemo, and Deadshot (the latter three are betrayed by the Squad and sent to the prison planet with the other villains).

Suicide Squad (vol. 3)

Background
John Ostrander returned to the Suicide Squad for an eight-issue miniseries that began in November 2007. The series takes place between the squad's appearance in Checkmate (vol. 2) #6–7 and the events of Salvation Run. It is functionally a sequel to the Checkmate arc, detailing how Rick Flag Jr. survived his apparent death before returning to Waller's Suicide Squad.

DC Comics' official solicitations consistently referred to the miniseries as Suicide Squad: Raise the Flag, though this nomenclature is never used within any individual issue or collected edition of the miniseries.

Plot synopsis
After he is believed dead, Rick Flag Jr. resurfaces on the dinosaur-infested island of Skartaris alongside his enemy Rustam. The pair works together to survive. Unfortunately, Flag is forced to kill Rustam once they discover a way home. Afterward, he becomes a prisoner of war in Qurac for four years. Flag rejoins the Suicide Squad after he is rescued by Bronze Tiger.

After reviewing several new recruits, Amanda Waller briefs the Squad on the latest target: a Dubai-based global conglomerate called Haake-Bruton, whose new viral weapon is to be destroyed, and its board of directors eliminated. The Squad airdrops onto Haake-Bruton's island stronghold, where Flag encounters Rustam's revenge-seeking father. Eiling compromises the mission, conspiring with Thinker to betray the Squad to Haake-Bruton's board in exchange for asylum. The Squad suffers heavy casualties in the sudden internal conflict. Despite numerous setbacks, Deadshot carries out the assassination, while Waller confronts the General personally. Eiling demonstrates control over Flag via psychological conditioning; Flag subdues him after revealing the cooperation as a ruse, and the Squad returns to Belle Reve. Flag is unfazed by Waller's revelation that his own identity and memories are implanted, asserting to Nightshade that he is still Rick Flag Jr.

Membership: Raise the Flag

Notable team members from Suicide Squad (vol. 3) include:

 Amanda Waller
 Rick Flag Jr.
 Blackguard
 Bronze Tiger
 Captain Boomerang I (George "Digger" Harkness)
 Captain Boomerang II (Owen Mercer)
 Chemo
 Count Vertigo
 Deadshot
 King Faraday
 The General
 Marauder
 Multiplex
 Nightshade
 Plastique
 Thinker II (Cliff Carmichael)
 Twister
 White Dragon (William Heller)
 Windfall

Interim stories (between Vol. 3–4)

Background
The Squad made prominent appearances in a four-issue Manhunter (vol. 4) arc and during the Blackest Night crossover event. In his multiverse-spanning adventures, Booster Gold briefly cooperated with a version of the Silver Age Squad. These issues mark the Squad's final appearances prior to DC Comics' New 52 continuity reboot in 2011.

Plot synopsis

Manhunter (vol. 4): "Forgotten"

The Suicide Squad has a run-in with Manhunter after she unknowingly compromises their months-long undercover investigation into the Crime Doctor's metahuman genetic experiments in collaboration with Vestech Industries. Manhunter backs off of the trail at the insistence of the Squad and the Birds of Prey, but goes rogue in an effort to bring down the Crime Doctor, who futilely attempts to restrain the Squad after becoming aware of their deep-cover duplicity. The operation is dismantled, and Manhunter goes public with the takedown.

Booster Gold (vol. 2): "1952 Pick-up"

On one of his adventures throughout the DC multiverse, Booster Gold winds up in an alternate 1952, where Karin Grace drafts him into a Squad led by Frank Rock. The team infiltrates a U.S. military compound to root out a Soviet double-agent, who ultimately turns out to be the creator of the Rocket Reds' combat armor.

Blackest Night: "Danse Macabre"

In the three-issue Blackest Night tie-in arc "Danse Macabre" (written by Gail Simone and John Ostrander), several deceased Suicide Squad members are reanimated as Black Lanterns (unofficially known as the "Homicide Squad"), led by Fiddler. They attack the Squad and the Secret Six, who are engaged in simultaneous conflicts at their respective headquarters, owing to Amanda Waller's plans to shut down the Six. The two teams join forces to wipe out the Homicide Squad; with the immediate threat resolved, the Six assert their independence, and Deadshot places a bullet mere centimeters from Waller's heart to punctuate the point. As she recovers at Belle Reve, she reveals that she is secretly Mockingbird, the Secret Six's mysterious benefactor.

Suicide Squad (vol. 4)

Background
A new Suicide Squad title, written by Adam Glass with art by Federico Dallocchio and Ransom Getty, launched in September 2011 as part of The New 52 (a reboot of the DC Comics universe). Amanda Waller once again directs a crew of black ops agents on covert government missions, with Deadshot serving as the field team's leader. The ongoing series is notable as serving as something of a showpiece for Batman villain Harley Quinn, and it has crossed over with other New 52 titles, including Resurrection Man, Grifter, and Justice League of America's Vibe.

Plot synopsis
After a botched government mission forces her to execute an injured teammate, Amanda Waller sets out to assemble an expendable field team, prompting the formation of a new Suicide Squad. Waller forces dozens of Belle Reve's death row inmates into a series of rigorous tests and torture scenarios to evaluate their loyalty and value as potential Squad members. The finalists—notably including Deadshot, King Shark, and Harley Quinn—are outfitted with micro-bomb implants, and inducted into the Squad.

The Suicide Squad's missions typically involve the elimination or retrieval of high-value targets. At one point, the team must track down an AWOL Harley Quinn; in another mission, the Squad goes after Resurrection Man. The Basilisk terrorist group serves as a recurring villain (echoing the Onslaught organization from John Ostrander's original Suicide Squad series), and several issues delve into the twisted relationship between Harley Quinn and the Joker.

Eventually, Waller recruits serial killer James Gordon Jr. to act as Belle Reve's in-house psychiatric adviser—but unbeknownst to her, Gordon quickly develops a twisted infatuation with her. One ongoing and unresolved plot point involves the Samsara serum—a medical treatment that Belle Reve's doctors use to resurrect dead Squad members (including Deadshot and Voltaic). It is eventually discovered that the serum will permanently kill anyone to whom it is administered; Waller is implied to be one such subject.

Forever Evil
During the Forever Evil crossover event, the Crime Syndicate of America emerges as the new threat which the Suicide Squad must avert. After the destruction of Belle Reve and the release of its inmates, Waller recruits Deadshot to a new Suicide Squad team. He, in turn, recruits Harley Quinn. Amanda Waller later reveals to James Gordon Jr. that the current Suicide Squad is but one version of the Task Force; she calls out Task Force Y to assist in battling the Crime Syndicate.

Membership: Suicide Squad (vol. 4)

Notable team members from Suicide Squad (vol. 4) include:

 Amanda Waller
 Black Spider (Eric Needham)
 Cheetah
 Captain Boomerang I (George "Digger" Harkness)
 Deadshot
 El Diablo (Chato Santana)
 James Gordon Jr.
 King Shark
 Light and Lime
 Harley Quinn
 Savant
 Unknown Soldier
 Voltaic 
 Yo-Yo (Chang Jie-Ru)

New Suicide Squad

Background

This 2014 relaunch, from writer Sean Ryan and artist Jeremy Roberts, sees Deadshot and Harley Quinn teaming up with new Squad members Black Manta, Joker's Daughter, the Reverse Flash and Deathstroke.

Membership: New Suicide Squad

Notable team members from New Suicide Squad include:

 Amanda Waller
 Black Manta
 Captain Boomerang
 Cheetah
 Deadshot
 Deathstroke
 El Diablo
 Joker's Daughter
 Parasite
 Harley Quinn
 Reverse-Flash

Suicide Squad (vol. 5)

Background
Using the end of the New 52 initiative as a launching point, DC Comics began a second relaunch of its entire line of titles called DC Rebirth in 2016, written by Rob Williams and shifting between Jim Lee, John Romita, Jr., and Tony S. Daniel for art. Suicide Squad (vol. 5) #1 (August 2016) was the debut bimonthly relaunch of the team's comic book title which consisted of Amanda Waller, Deadshot, Rick Flag, Captain Boomerang, Harley Quinn, Killer Croc, Katana and Enchantress. The Suicide Squad was given a new look, reflecting the team's appearance in the DC Extended Universe. The title would crossover with Justice League in Justice League vs. Suicide Squad, written by Joshua Williamson and drawn by Jason Fabok, Tony S. Daniel, and Howard Porter.

Plot synopsis

The Black Vault
The Suicide Squad are sent to a Russian prison to retrieve a secret item, which turns out to be a portal to the Phantom Zone. During the unfolding events, a Russian group of metahumans, known as the Annihilation Brigade, shows up and the situation worsens. General Zod gets free of the Vault, and Captain Boomerang is killed. The battle is brought to an abrupt halt as a new character, Hack, breaches the Russian database and learns how to pull General Zod back into the portal.

Going Sane
Back in Belle Reve, scientists working for Waller are examining the portal. Waller shares her intent to weaponize Zod and add him to her Suicide Squad. Flag disagrees, and conflict escalates between the two, leading to Flag firing his gun at Waller.

In the next issue, Amanda's scientists continue trying to extract Zod. Meanwhile, the portal is sending out electromagnetic waves, and the characters appear to act in increasingly erratic ways. The portal waves are shown as having the opposite effect on Harley, causing her to realise she must intervene in the escalating blood lust.

Justice League vs. Suicide Squad
This episode follows the Squad to the fictional island of Badhinisia, where the team has been dispatched to prevent the Brimstone Brotherhood from causing an earthquake. During the events, the Squad is confronted by the Justice League, having learned of the team's existence from Batman. Waller shares her intention to blow the bombs in their necks if they are captured by, or surrender to, the League. The Suicide Squad are defeated by the Justice League until Killer Frost absorbs a portion of a weakened Superman's life force and freezes everyone.

Back at Belle Reve Penitentiary, the Justice League has been captured by Amanda. Batman escapes his confinement and confronts Waller about her plans for the League. When the plot reveals the approaching threat of Max Lord and his super villain team, the two teams must pool their efforts in order to prevent the theft of a powerful weapon from inside Belle Reve.

As the story progresses, Lord succeeds in stealing the Heart of Darkness (a.k.a. the Eclipso Diamond) and uses it to control the League, and through them, gains control of the world. Batman rallies Lobo and the remaining Squad members to make a final stand against Lord, escalating to conflict with the compromised Justice League. Meanwhile, Amanda observes that Lord himself is falling under the influence of the Eclipso Diamond, and warns him of this when Lord has her brought to the White House. Lord realises too late that Waller's warning held truth. In the following chaos, Batman deems them the new Justice League. Although Lord is able to bring most of the Squad/League under his control, he is defeated when Killer Frost, acting on Batman's instructions, is able to create a prism of ice that reflects Superman's heat vision in a frequency that will disrupt Eclipso's control of the heroes, Eclipso himself being vanquished by Killer Frost as she draws on the life energy of the rest of the heroes and Squad members present, thus limiting the drain on any one of them. In the aftermath of the crisis, Killer Frost is officially released while Lord is kept in Waller's custody, Waller musing that she will use him for 'Task Force XI'.

Burning Down the House

Earthlings on Fire

Kill Your Darlings

Drain the Swamp
Waller recruits Juan Soria, a prospective hero who was turned down by the Justice League and then arrested for robbery, into the Squad in order to combat an alien force that feeds off optimism and hope. In preparation for the mission, Waller had systematically broken Soria down to rid him of any and all hope. This allowed him to defeat the creature. After learning that he was used, Waller relocates Soria to Killer Croc's cell. Croc had previously been tempted to eat Soria and it is assumed this is what happened.

The Squad confronts Damage, who Waller wants to recruit for her Task Force XL. Meanwhile, King Faraday, who is still being held at Belle Reve, reveals he's been accessing Waller's hidden files and asks about someone named Coretta. Waller is visually shaken by the mention. She leaves the prison and goes to her daughter Coretta in the hospital as she's just given birth to Waller's grandchild. Her son Jessie tells her that Coretta does not want to see her. Hack returns and reveals she is in Belle Reve's computers. She begins opening the cells, erasing files, and murdering guards.

Suicide Squad Black

Background
DC Comics created a magical version of the Suicide Squad known as Suicide Squad Black in 2019 during the DC Rebirth run. It was created by Jai Nitz and Scot Eaton. The team have a six-issue comic series titled Suicide Squad: Black Files.

The roster consists of the Gentleman Ghost, Azucar, the Enchantress, Juniper, Klarion the Witch Boy, Tiamat, and Wither, and El Diablo for a magical roster of the Squad called Suicide Squad Black.

Plot synopsis
The Revenge of Kobra

Rota Fortuna

War in Two Worlds

My Own Worst Enemy!

Fugitive from Myself

Reverse Image

Suicide Squad (vol. 6)
The monthly Suicide Squad comic was again relaunched at the start of 2020, written by Tom Taylor with art by Bruno Redondo.

The initial storyline features a Task Force X run by a mysterious bureaucrat called Lok directing a team composed of Deadshot, Harley Quinn, Magpie, Cavalier, the Shark and the Zebra-Man to press gang a group of anarchist superhumans called the Revolutionaries.<ref>Suicide Squad' (vol. 8) #1</ref> Over the course of the first six issues several Revolutionaries are killed in action; it transpires that the Revolutionaries were deliberately setting themselves up in infiltrate Task Force X and Lok is a frontman for Black Mask, who is impersonating Ted Kord.

Suicide Squad (vol. 7)
The Infinite Frontier monthly Suicide Squad comic launched in March 2021, written by Robbie Thompson with art by Eduardo Pansica.

Membership: Suicide Squad (vol. 7)

Notable team members from Suicide Squad (vol. 7) include:

 Amanda Waller
 Peacemaker
 Nocturna
 Match
 Talon
 Culebra
 Bloodsport
 Ambush Bug
 Black Siren
 Major Force

Collected editions

Silver Age

Post-Crisis
Volume 1
{| class="wikitable"
|-
! #
! Title
! Material collected
! Pages
! Year
! ISBN
|-
| 1
| Trial by Fire|
 Suicide Squad #1–8
 Secret Origins #14
| 232
| 
| 
|-
| 2
| The Nightshade Odyssey|
 Suicide Squad #9–16
 'Justice League International #13
 Doom Patrol/Suicide Squad Special #1
| 264
| 
| 
|-
| 3
| Rogues
| 
 Suicide Squad #17–25, Annual #1
| 280
| 
| 
|-
| 4
| The Janus Directive
| 
 Suicide Squad #26–30
 Checkmate! #15–18
 Manhunter #14
 Firestorm #86
 Captain Atom #30
| 272
| 
| 
|-
| 5
| Apokolips Now
| 
 Suicide Squad #31–39
| 220
| 
| 
|-
| 6
| The Phoenix Gambit
| 
 Suicide Squad #40–49
| 235
| 
| 
|-
| 7
| The Dragon's Hoard
| 
 Suicide Squad #50–58
| 232
| 
| 
|-
| 8
| The Final Mission
| 
 Suicide Squad #59–66
| 192
| 
| 
|-
|}

Volume 1 Spin-Offs

Volume 2

Volume 3

The New 52

Volume 4

New Suicide Squad

Suicide Squad: Most Wanted
The Most Wanted miniseries highlight individual members of the Suicide Squad.

DC Rebirth

Volume 5

Volume 6

Volume 7

In other media

Television

Animation

 Task Force X appears in a self-titled episode of Justice League Unlimited, consisting of Rick Flag Jr., Captain Boomerang, Deadshot, Plastique, and the Clock King. They are given the mission to appropriate the Annihilator automaton from the Justice League's Watchtower on behalf of Project Cadmus. The team attack the Watchtower during its weakest point, managing to defeat Atom Smasher, Vigilante, and Shining Knight. Despite the Martian Manhunter and Captain Atom's intervention and Plastique being critically wounded, the team succeeds. According to the series' producers, this episode resulted from the realization that Project Cadmus needed a solid victory to cement itself as a credible threat.
 Task Force X appears in the Young Justice episode "Leverage", consisting of Rick Flag, Black Manta, Captain Boomerang, and Monsieur Mallah. In the audio play "The Prize", Brick and Tuppence Terror of the Terror Twins have since joined the team.
 The Suicide Squad make a cameo appearance in the Harley Quinn episode "Harlivy", consisting of Captain Boomerang, Killer Croc, the Enchantress, Deadshot, and Katana as the "a-team" and Plastique as a minor member.

Live-action
 The Suicide Squad appear in the tenth season of Smallville, consisting of Rick Flag, Deadshot, Plastique, and Warp. While this version of the group originally worked for Amanda Waller and Checkmate, they later began working for Chloe Sullivan.
 The Suicide Squad appears in the Arrowverse series Arrow. Introduced in a self-titled second season episode, this version of the team works for A.R.G.U.S. Director Amanda Waller and initially consists of Floyd Lawton / Deadshot, Mark Scheffer / Shrapnel and Ben Turner / Bronze Tiger. Additionally, John Diggle and Lyla Michaels also work as part of the team, but are not implanted with explosives, and Harley Quinn makes a cameo appearance, but is not called for duty. Scheffer is killed by Waller as a result of him abandoning the mission while Diggle releases the remaining members from A.R.G.U.S.'s custody in the season two finale "Unthinkable" to help him stop Waller from bombing Starling City in an attempt to defeat Slade Wilson's army. In the season three episode "Draw Back Your Bow" Oliver Queen takes pity on Carrie Cutter / Cupid and hands her over to Waller for use in the squad. In the episode "The Brave and the Bold", it is revealed that Digger Harkness was once a member of the squad, but his last mission became a failure and Michaels ordered the mission and him to be terminated, which proved to be unsuccessful. Harkness seeks revenge in the present, but is foiled by Queen and the Flash. In the episode "Suicidal Tendencies", Diggle, Michaels, Lawton, and Cutter rescue Senator Joseph Cray from a hostage situation, during which Lawton sacrifices himself to save the others after discovering Cray had set up the attack to stage his own rescue and eventually mount a presidential campaign. After Shadowspire kills Waller, Michaels becomes A.R.G.U.S.'s new director and disbands the squad as part of her efforts to reform the organization. In the season seven episode "My Name is Emiko Queen", Michaels reforms the squad as the "Ghost Initiative" and recruits Cutter, Chien Na Wei, Kane Wolfman, and Ricardo Diaz to locate and capture a terrorist financier named Dante without A.R.G.U.S.'s oversight. However, the operation fails after Diaz disables his explosive implant and warns Dante, who manages to escape. When the Joint Chiefs of Staff learn that the squad had been reactivated, Diggle resigns from A.R.G.U.S. to protect Michaels.
 At San Diego Comic-Con 2014, following the squad's debut episode, Diggle's actor David Ramsey revealed that there had been talk of a spin-off that would focus on Arrows version of the Suicide Squad. However, Arrow co-producer and comic book writer Keto Shimizu stated in January 2015 that with David Ayer's Suicide Squad film in development at the time, "it doesn't seem like it's a possibility." In September 2016, series producer Greg Berlanti confirmed that the team's inclusion within Arrow was used in order to test the audience's reception and interest prior to Ayer's film being put into production.

Film

Live-action
Two versions of the Suicide Squad appear in films set in the DC Extended Universe. 
 
 In Suicide Squad (2016), Amanda Waller forms Task Force X to save the world from Enchantress. Waller recruits Deadshot, Harley Quinn, Captain Boomerang, El Diablo, Killer Croc, and Slipknot, with Rick Flag as their leader and Katana supporting him.

 A stand-alone sequel titled The Suicide Squad (2021), follows Task Force X clashing with the Thinker and Starro. Waller recruits Flag, Quinn, Boomerang, Savant, Blackguard, T.D.K. (The Detachable Kid), Javelin, Mongal, and Weasel to serve as a distraction while Bloodsport, Peacemaker, King Shark, Polka-Dot Man, and Ratcatcher 2 complete the mission.

Animation
 While Darwyn Cooke's DC: The New Frontier comic series was adapted into the direct-to-video film Justice League: The New Frontier, the Suicide Squad was cut for brevity, with only Rick Flag and Hal Jordan remaining.
 The Suicide Squad appears in the Batman: Arkham film Batman: Assault on Arkham, consisting of Deadshot, Harley Quinn, King Shark, Killer Frost, Captain Boomerang, Black Spider, and KGBeast while Amanda Waller monitors their activities and controls their every move with bombs surgically implanted in their spines which she can detonate if they step out of line. Waller kills KGBeast as an example of this. The squad is assigned to kill the Riddler, whom they later discover was a former member who discovered how to defuse Waller's bombs. Throughout the course of the film, Black Spider and King Shark are killed by the bombs before they could be defused, Quinn is remanded to Arkham Asylum, Captain Boomerang is re-captured by the GCPD and Deadshot escapes and attempts to kill Waller while Killer Frost's fate remains unknown.

 The Suicide Squad appears in films set in the DC Animated Movie Universe:
 The group first appears in Suicide Squad: Hell to Pay, consisting of Deadshot, Harley Quinn, Captain Boomerang, Bronze Tiger, Killer Frost, and Copperhead. Additionally, Black Manta, Count Vertigo, Punch and Jewelee appeared as previous members of the group from three years before the film's events. The present team is assigned to retrieve a "Get Out of Hell Free" card. By the end of the film, Waller detonates Copperhead's bomb to kill the traitorous Killer Frost and Bronze Tiger is killed by Professor Zoom, though Deadshot gives the former the card to send him to heaven.
 The Suicide Squad appears in Justice League Dark: Apokolips War. Following Waller's death, the group is now led by Harley and consists of Captain Boomerang, King Shark, Black Manta, Bane, and the Cheetah. After Darkseid and his forces successfully conquer Earth, the squad members take refuge on Stryker's Island. Two years later, they are recruited by Lois Lane to aid her and Clark Kent in one last effort to defeat Darkseid and destroy Apokolips. The group storm LexCorp so Kent's team can reach Apokolips via Lex Luthor's Boom Tube before the squad stays behind with Lane and Luthor to defend the Boom Tube from Darkseid's Paradooms. After Cheetah, Luthor, Bane, and Manta are killed, the remaining members and Lois detonate the building to stop the Paradooms from reaching Apokolips.

Video games
 The New 52 Suicide Squad appear in "The Squad" DLC pack for Lego Batman 3: Beyond Gotham, consisting of Amanda Waller, Deadshot, Harley Quinn, Captain Boomerang, El Diablo, King Shark, Deathstroke, and Katana. Waller assigns the squad to find the person who infiltrated Belle Reve. By the end of the mission, the team discovers Killer Moth attempting to expose their existence and defeat him.
 The Suicide Squad appear in Suicide Squad: Special Ops.
 The Suicide Squad, though not referred to by name, appear in Batman: The Enemy Within. If the Joker becomes a vigilante, it is revealed that Amanda Waller has former Pact members Harley Quinn, Bane, and Catwoman working for her, using bomb collars as a means of control. The group are used against Batman and the Joker, though the former can negotiate for their release after he saves Waller from the latter.
 The Suicide Squad appears in Lego DC Super-Villains. Catwoman sends Killer Frost and the Rookie to Belle Reve to see if Harley Quinn's Task Force X acquaintances know her whereabouts. With Deadshot and Captain Boomerang in tow, the newly formed group heads to the Gotham Botanical Gardens to retrieve Harley. Upon arrival, Boomerang enrages Poison Ivy. A battle ensues until Catwoman intervenes and the group reveal their intentions to Harley, who is taken away by Deathstorm and Grid. The group rushes to rescue her, and she escapes with Ivy, Deadshot, and the Rookie while Killer Frost and Catwoman hold off the Crime Syndicate.

Batman: Arkham
 In the post-credits scene of Batman: Arkham Origins, Amanda Waller visits Deathstroke in Blackgate Penitentiary and asks him to join the Suicide Squad in exchange for his freedom. An Easter Egg also features Harleen Quinzel holding the Squad's recruitment file in her character model, the same one Waller gives to Deathstroke, foreshadowing her future membership in the team as Harley Quinn.
 In the post-credits scene of Batman: Arkham Origins Blackgate, Waller and Rick Flag Jr. recruit Bronze Tiger and Deadshot into the Squad.
 In 2020, Rocksteady Studios, the developers of the Batman: Arkham series, announced that they were developing a new game centered around the team, titled Suicide Squad: Kill the Justice League. The announcement was accompanied by a teaser image of the game's logo in the style of a crosshair aimed at Superman. The game was fully unveiled during the online event DC FanDome on August 22, 2020 with a 2022 release date. The game will be released on May 26, 2023.

See also
 List of government agencies in DC Comics
 Checkmate (comics)
 Janus Directive
 Secret Six (comics)
 Thunderbolts (comics) - Marvel Comics’ equivalent to the Suicide Squad

References

 
Comics by John Ostrander
Comics characters introduced in 1959
DC Comics adapted into films
Fictional military organizations
Supervillains with their own comic book titles
Batman characters